Simpson United Methodist Church is a historic church at High and Jefferson Streets in Perth Amboy, Middlesex County, New Jersey, United States.

It was built in 1866 and added to the National Register of Historic Places on April 6, 1979.

References

United Methodist churches in New Jersey
Churches on the National Register of Historic Places in New Jersey
Italianate architecture in New Jersey
Churches completed in 1866
19th-century Methodist church buildings in the United States
Churches in Middlesex County, New Jersey
National Register of Historic Places in Middlesex County, New Jersey
New Jersey Register of Historic Places
Perth Amboy, New Jersey
1866 establishments in New Jersey
Italianate church buildings in the United States